Health marketing is an approach to public health promotion that applies traditional marketing principles and theories alongside science-based strategies to protect and promote the health of diverse populations. It involves creating, communicating, and delivering messages to the public on prevention, health promotion and health protection. Health marketing enables organizations to gain more exposure for their achievements, such as advancements in medicine. Likewise, health-protecting services, such as insurance, also benefit from the same marketing principles.

The marketing strategy would follow the traditional "4Ps" of marketing, namely product, place, promotion, and price. In the case of health marketing:
 "Product" refers to the (surgical) procedure.
 "Place" refers to the access to this procedure.
 "Promotion" refers to creating awareness and demand of the procedure.
 "Price" refers to the cost of the procedure e.g. money, time, reputation, etc.

"Health marketing" is a term rarely used in public healthcare and related disciplines. "Social marketing" or "integrated marketing communication" is more commonly used in public health and other disciplines to refer to marketing-based planning frameworks for public health communication.

Medical marketing in the private sector 
Health Marketing or Medical Marketing is a specialized branch of marketing. Medical marketing was created to attract new patients in private health settings. The characteristics of the health market make it a unique kind of marketing. Medical marketing is usually a business to consumer (B2C) service. The primary customers for these medical marketing companies are Generation Z. About 85% of Gen Zers said they are open to alternative healthcare options that combine offline and online experiences like telemedicine, dispatch services and membership-based services. Healthcare professionals using this type of marketing usually offer beauty-related services, such as aesthetic medicine, plastic surgery, dental surgery or dermatology and much more.

Regulations 
In many countries, the advertising of medical procedures is regulated, especially in aesthetics and plastic surgery. Showing "before and after" pictures or making references to someone’s body type can be seen as harmful to society. The solution for a health care professional or a medical marketing agency is Instagram marketing since nowadays it remains unregulated, being one of the fastest growing social media, gives doctors an opportunity to acquire new patients through Instagram Marketing.

See also 
 Marketing mix
 Services marketing

References

External links
 CDC - Gateway to Health Communication & Social Marketing Practice

Marketing by industry
Health promotion
Health care industry